Cobamide is a naturally occurring chemical compound containing cobalt in the corrinoid family of macrocyclic complexes. Cobamide works as a coenzyme with some enzymes in bacteria. The cobalt atom may have a transferable methyl group attached. It is used for example in 5-methyltetrahydrosarcinapterin:corrinoid/iron-sulfur protein Co-methyltransferase.

References

Organocobalt compounds
Corrinoids
Coenzymes